Alvor may refer to:

 Alvor (Portimão), a civil parish in the municipality of Portimão, Portugal 
 Alvor Castle, a castle in the parish of Alvor, district of Faro, Portugal